Neus Munté Fernández (born 13 November 1970, in Barcelona) is a pro-Catalan independence Spanish politician.

Early life and education 
Munté received a law degree from Barcelona University, and a master's degree in public law and administrative organisation from Pompeu Fabra University.

Career 
As a lawyer, she worked for Catalonia's General Union of Workers (UGT), and from 1996 to 1999 served as a member of the National Executive Committee of its Public Services Federation. She was also the union's labour and education secretary, and institutional policy secretary, in the period from 2004 to 2010.

Political career 
From 1999 to 2002, Munté served as chief of staff of the Education Ministry, and in 2002 she was elected to the Parliament of Catalonia, holding a seat until 2003. In 2010 she returned to Parliament, serving until 2013. During this period, she was the ruling CiU's education spokesperson and chaired the Personal Equality Committee.

Munte has been a member of CDC, the CiU's senior partner, since 1996.  In 1998 she was elected deputy secretary general of the JNC, the CDC's youth wing, a post she held until 2000. At the party conference in 2012, she was elected CDC executive secretary responsible for specialized policy committees. Since December 2012 she has served as Minister of Social Welfare and Family Affairs in the Generalitat of Catalonia, and since 2015 she is the vice president of the Generalitat of Catalonia.

References 

Living people
1970 births
University of Barcelona alumni
Pompeu Fabra University alumni
Members of the Parliament of Catalonia
Politicians from Barcelona
Convergence and Union politicians
Social affairs ministers of Catalonia
21st-century Spanish politicians
21st-century Spanish women politicians
Members of the 11th Parliament of Catalonia
Vice Presidents of Catalonia
Barcelona municipal councillors (2019–2023)